Bonham Road is a main road in West Mid-Levels, Hong Kong Island in Hong Kong, running mainly East-West. The road connects Pok Fu Lam Road in the west, near the University of Hong Kong, and Caine Road in the east, at the junction with Hospital Road and Seymour Road. It was named after Sir George Bonham, the third Governor of Hong Kong. It was renamed Nishi-Taisho Dori (西大正通) during Japanese occupation of Hong Kong.

Features
Several historical buildings are located on the road, including Fung Ping Shan building, Hung Hing Ying building and the Main Building of The University of Hong Kong. There are also a few well known schools located on the road, including King's College, St. Paul's College, Hong Kong, St. Stephen's Girls' College, St. Clare's Primary School, Bonham Road Government Primary School, Chinese Rhenish Church Hong Kong which is there in the 19th century.

Bonham Road Flyover
Bonham Road Flyover is a one-way, single-lane flyover allowing vehicles travelling north on Pok Fu Lam Road to turn east onto Bonham Road. It was completed in 1973.

Landmarks

Community Facilities
Sai Ying Pun Community Complex

Transport
MTR Sai Ying Pun station

Education
University of Hong Kong
St. Stephen's Girls' College
King's College, Hong Kong
St. Paul's College, Hong Kong
St. Stephen's Church College
Bonham Road Government Primary School
St. Claire's Primary School

Religious
 Chinese Rehinish Church (Hong Kong)
 Hop Yat Church (Hong Kong)
 St. Anthony's Church (Hong Kong)

Nature
 Stone wall trees

Military
 88 Bonham Road - Western Barracks (Bonham Tower Barracks) of the Hong Kong Garrison

Intersecting roads
Listed from West to East:

 Pok Fu Lam Road
 Hill Road
 Hing Hon Road (Private Road)
 Western Street
 Honiton Road
 Centre Street (pedestrianised)
 Park Road (Hong Kong)
 Breezy Path
 Hospital Road
 Seymour Road (Hong Kong)
 Caine Road

See also
List of streets and roads in Hong Kong
High Street, Hong Kong
Bonham Strand

References

External links

Roads on Hong Kong Island
Sai Ying Pun